Dunhuang is a county-level city in Northwestern Gansu Province, Western China. According to the 2010 Chinese census, the city has a population of 186,027, though 2019 estimates put the city's population at about 191,800. Dunhuang was a major stop on the ancient Silk Road and is best known for the nearby Mogao Caves.

Dunhuang is situated in an oasis containing Crescent Lake and Mingsha Shan (meaning "Singing-Sand Mountain"), named after the sound of the wind whipping off the dunes, the singing sand phenomenon. Dunhuang commands a strategic position at the crossroads of the ancient Southern Silk Route and the main road leading from India via Lhasa to Mongolia and Southern Siberia, and also controls the entrance to the narrow Hexi Corridor, which leads straight to the heart of the north Chinese plains and the ancient capitals of Chang'an (today known as Xi'an) and Luoyang.

Administratively, the county-level city of Dunhuang is part of the prefecture-level city of Jiuquan. Historically, the city and/or its surrounding region has also been known by the names Shazhou (prefecture of sand) or Guazhou (prefecture of melons). In the modern era, the two alternative names have been assigned respectively to Shazhou zhen (Shazhou town) which serves as Dunhuang's seat of government, and to the neighboring Guazhou County.

Etymology
A number of derivations of the name Dunhuang have been suggested by scholars:
 Giles 1892:   ‘artificial mound, tumulus, beacon mound, square block of stone or wood’ + ‘blazing, bright, luminous’.
 Mathews (1931) 1944:  , now usually  ‘regard as important, to esteem; honest, sincere, generous’ + ‘a great blaze; luminous, glittering’.
 McGraw-Hill 1963:   (‘honest + shining’).
 Jáo and Demieville 1971 (French, Airs de Touen-houang):    ‘noise of burning’ + ‘great blaze’ [per Mathews].
 Lín Yǚtáng 1972:  ‘small mound (+ shining)’ or  ‘to shimmer (+ shining)’.
 Kāngxī 1716:  , also   [t=t’].
 Mair 1977, Ptolemy's c. 150 Geography refers to Dunhuang as Greek  (Throana), possibly from Iranian Druvana meaning something like "fortress for tax collecting."

History

There is evidence of habitation in the area as early as 2,000 BC, possibly by people recorded as the Qiang in Chinese history. Its name was also mentioned in relation to the homeland of the Yuezhi in the Records of the Grand Historian. Some have argued that this may refer to the unrelated toponym Dunhong – the archaeologist Lin Meicun has also suggested that Dunhuan may be a Chinese name for the Tukhara, a people widely believed to be a Central Asian offshoot of the Yuezhi.

By the third century BC, the area became dominated by the Xiongnu, but came under Chinese rule during the Han dynasty after Emperor Wu defeated the Xiongnu in 121 BC.

Dunhuang was one of the four frontier garrison towns (along with Jiuquan, Zhangye and Wuwei) established by the Emperor Wu after the defeat of the Xiongnu, and the Chinese built fortifications at Dunhuang and sent settlers there.  The name Dunhuang, meaning "Blazing Beacon", refers to the beacons lit to warn of attacks by marauding nomadic tribes.  Dunhuang Commandery was probably established shortly after 104 BC.  Located in the western end of the Hexi Corridor near the historic junction of the Northern and Southern Silk Roads, Dunhuang was a town of military importance."The Great Wall was extended to Dunhuang, and a line of fortified beacon towers stretched westwards into the desert. By the second century AD Dunhuang had a population of more than 76,000 and was a key supply base for caravans that passed through the city: those setting out for the arduous trek across the desert loaded up with water and food supplies, and others arriving from the west gratefully looked upon the mirage-like sight of Dunhuang's walls, which signified safety and comfort. Dunhuang prospered on the heavy flow of traffic. The first Buddhist caves in the Dunhuang area were hewn in 353."

During the Sui (581–618) and Tang (618–907) dynasties, it was the main stop of communication between ancient China and the rest of the world and a major hub of commerce of the Silk Road. Dunhuang was the intersection city of all three main silk routes (north, central, south) during this time.

From the West also came early Buddhist monks, who had arrived in China by the first century AD, and a sizable Buddhist community eventually developed in Dunhuang. The caves carved out by the monks, originally used for meditation, developed into a place of worship and pilgrimage called the Mogao Caves or "Caves of a Thousand Buddhas." A number of Christian, Jewish, and Manichaean artifacts have also been found in the caves (see for example Jingjiao Documents), testimony to the wide variety of people who made their way along the Silk Road.

During the time of the Sixteen Kingdoms, Li Gao established the Western Liang here in 400 AD. In 405 the capital of the Western Liang was moved from Dunhuang to Jiuquan. In 421 the Western Liang was conquered by the Northern Liang.

As a frontier town, Dunhuang was fought over and occupied at various times by non-Han people. After the fall of Han dynasty it came under the rule of various nomadic tribes, such as the Xiongnu during Northern Liang and the Turkic Tuoba during Northern Wei. The Tibetans occupied Dunhuang when the Tang Empire became weakened considerably after the An Lushan Rebellion; and even though it was later returned to Tang rule, it was under quasi-autonomous rule by the local general Zhang Yichao, who expelled the Tibetans in 848. After the fall of Tang, Zhang's family formed the Kingdom of Golden Mountain in 910, but in 911 it came under the influence of the Uighurs. The Zhangs were succeeded by the Cao family, who formed alliances with the Uighurs and the Kingdom of Khotan. During the Song dynasty, Dunhuang fell outside the Chinese borders. In 1036 the Tanguts who founded the Western Xia dynasty captured Dunhuang. From the reconquest of 848 to about 1036 (i.e. era of the Guiyi Circuit), Dunhuang was a multicultural entrepot that contained one of the largest ethnic Sogdian communities in China following the An Lushan Rebellion. The Sogdians were Sinified to some extent and were bilingual in Chinese and Sogdian, and wrote their documents in Chinese characters, but horizontally from left to right instead of right to left in vertical lines, as Chinese was normally written at the time.

Dunhuang was conquered in 1227 by the Mongols, who sacked and destroyed the town, and the rebuilt town became part of the Mongol Empire in the wake of Kublai Khan's conquest of China under the Yuan dynasty. Dunhuang went into a steep decline after the Chinese trade with the outside world became dominated by Southern sea-routes, and the Silk Road was officially abandoned during the Ming dynasty. It was occupied again by the Tibetans c. 1516, and also came under the influence of the Chagatai Khanate in the early sixteenth century. It was retaken by China two centuries later c. 1715 during the Qing dynasty, and the present-day city of Dunhuang was established east of the ruined old city in 1725. In 1988, Dunhuang was elevated from county to county-level city status. On March 31, 1995, Turpan and Dunhuang became sister cities.

Today, the site is an important tourist attraction and the subject of an ongoing archaeological project. A large number of manuscripts and artifacts retrieved at Dunhuang have been digitized and made publicly available via the International Dunhuang Project. The spreading Kumtag Desert, the result of long-standing overgrazing of the surrounding land, has reached the edges of the city.

In 2011 satellite images showing huge structures in the desert near Dunhuang surfaced online and caused a brief media stir.

Culture

Buddhist caves

There are 735 caves in Mogao, and the caves in Mogao are particularly noted for their Buddhist art, as well as the hoard of manuscripts, the Dunhuang manuscripts, found hidden in a sealed-up cave. Many of these caves were covered with murals and contain many Buddhist statues. Discoveries continue to be found in the caves, including excerpts from a Christian Bible dating to the Yuan dynasty.

Numerous smaller Buddhist cave sites are located in the region, including the Western Thousand Buddha Caves, the Eastern Thousands Buddha Caves, and the Five Temple site.  The Yulin Caves are located further east in Guazhou County.

Other historical sites

Crescent Lake and Singing Sand Dunes
The Yang Pass
White Horse Pagoda
Dunhuang Limes

Museums

Dunhuang County Museum

Night market

Dunhuang Night Market is a night market held on the main thoroughfare, Dong Dajie, in the city centre of Dunhuang, popular with tourists during the summer months. Many souvenir items are sold, including such typical items as jade, jewelry, scrolls, hangings, small sculptures, leather shows puppets, coins, Tibetan horns and Buddha statues. A sizable number of members of China's ethnic minorities engage in business at these markets. A Central Asian dessert or sweet is also sold, consisting of a large, sweet confection made with nuts and dried fruit, sliced into the portion desired by the customer.

Geography

Climate
The diurnal temperature variation averages  annually. With monthly percent possible sunshine ranging from 69% in March to 82% in October, the city receives 3,258 hours of bright sunshine annually, making it one of the sunniest nationwide.

The Gansu Dunhuang Solar Park was built in the southwest suburbs of the city to harvest the abundant solar energy.

Administrative divisions
As of 2020, Dunhuang administers nine towns and one other township-level division. These township-level divisions then administer 56 village-level divisions.

Towns

Other township-level divisions

Historical divisions
Prior to 2019, the city administered  as a township-level division. In 2011,  was formed from Yangjiaqiao Township.

Demographics
2019 city estimates put Dunhuang's population at about 191,800. According to the 2010 Chinese census, Dunhuang has a population of 186,027, down slightly from the 187,578 recorded in the 2000 Chinese census. In 1996, the city had an estimated population of 125,000 people.

Dunhuang has an urbanization rate of 69.45% as of 2019.

In 2019, the city had a birth rate of 9.87‰, and a death rate of 5.69‰, giving it a rate of natural increase of 3.15‰.

97.8% of the city's population is ethnically Han Chinese, with the remaining 2.2% being 27 ethnic minorities, including ethnic Hui, Mongol, Tibetan, Uyghur, Miao, Manchu, Monguor, Kazakh, Dongxiang, and Yugur populations.

As of 2019, the annual per capita disposable income of urban residents was ¥36,215, and the annual per capita disposable income of rural residents was ¥18,852.

Economy
As of 2019, Dunhuang has a gross domestic product of ¥8.178 billion. The value of the city's primary sector totaled ¥0.994 billion, its secondary sector totaled ¥1.872 billion, and its tertiary sector totaled ¥5.312 billion.

As of 2020, Dunhuang has a gross domestic product of ¥7.778 billion. The value of the city's primary sector totaled ¥1.082 billion, its secondary sector totaled ¥1.752 billion, and its tertiary sector totaled ¥4.943 billion.

Transportation

Dunhuang is served by China National Highway 215 and Dunhuang Mogao International Airport,

A railway branch known as the Dunhuang railway or the Liudun Railway, constructed in 2004–2006, connects Dunhuang with the Liugou Station on the Lanzhou-Xinjiang railway (in Guazhou County). There is regular passenger service on the line, with overnight trains from Dunhuang to Lanzhou and Xi'an. Dunhuang Station is located northeast of town, near the airport.

The railway from Dunhuang was extended south into Qinghai, connecting Dunhuang to Subei, Mahai and Yinmaxia (near Golmud) on the Qingzang railway. The central section of this railway opened on 18 December 2019 completing the through route.

See also
Three hares (as a decorative motif)
Major National Historical and Cultural Sites (Gansu)
Bhadrakalpikasutra
Dunhuang Star Chart
Aurel Stein
Mogao caves
Paul Pelliot
Yangguan
Yueyaquan

Gallery

Footnotes

References
Baumer, Christoph. 2000. Southern Silk Road: In the Footsteps of Sir Aurel Stein and Sven Hedin. White Orchid Books. Bangkok.
Beal, Samuel. 1884. Si-Yu-Ki: Buddhist Records of the Western World, by Hiuen Tsiang. 2 vols. Trans. by Samuel Beal. London. Reprint: Delhi. Oriental Books Reprint Corporation. 1969.
Beal, Samuel. 1911. The Life of Hiuen-Tsiang by the Shaman Hwui Li, with an Introduction containing an account of the Works of I-Tsing. Trans. by Samuel Beal. London. 1911. Reprint: Munshiram Manoharlal, New Delhi. 1973.
Bonavia, Judy (2004): The Silk Road From Xi'an to Kashgar. Judy Bonavia – revised by Christoph Baumer. 2004. Odyssey Publications.
Cable, Mildred and Francesca French (1943): The Gobi Desert. London. Landsborough Publications.
Galambos, Imre (2015), "She Association Circulars from Dunhuang", in Antje Richter, A History of Chinese Letters and Epistolary Culture, Brill: Leiden, Boston, pp 853–77.
Hill, John E. 2004. The Peoples of the West from the Weilue 魏略 by Yu Huan 魚豢: A Third Century Chinese Account Composed between 239 and 265 CE. Draft annotated English translation. Weilue: The Peoples of the West
Hulsewé, A. F. P. and Loewe, M. A. N. 1979. China in Central Asia: The Early Stage 125 BC – AD 23: an annotated translation of chapters 61 and 96 of the History of the Former Han Dynasty. E. J. Brill, Leiden.
Legge, James. Trans. and ed. 1886. A Record of Buddhistic Kingdoms: being an account by the Chinese monk Fâ-hsien of his travels in India and Ceylon (AD 399–414) in search of the Buddhist Books of Discipline. Reprint: Dover Publications, New York. 1965.
Lok, Wai-ying. (2012). The significance of Dunhuang iconography from the perspective of Buddhist philosophy: a study mainly based on Cave 45 (PDF) (PhD Dissertation). The University of Hong Kong. 
Lovell, Julia (2006). The Great Wall : China against the World. 1000 BC — AD 2000. Atlantic Books, London. .
Mair, Victor. 2019. Greeks in ancient Central Asia: the Ionians. Language Log, 20 October 2019.
Skrine, C. P. (1926). Chinese Central Asia. Methuen, London. Reprint: Barnes & Noble, New York. 1971. .
Stein, Aurel M. 1907. Ancient Khotan: Detailed report of archaeological explorations in Chinese Turkestan, 2 vols. Clarendon Press. Oxford. National Institute of Informatics / Digital Archive of Toyo Bunko Rare Books – Digital Silk Road Project
Stein, Aurel M. 1921. Serindia: Detailed report of explorations in Central Asia and westernmost China, 5 vols. London & Oxford. Clarendon Press. Reprint: Delhi. Motilal Banarsidass. 1980. National Institute of Informatics / Digital Archive of Toyo Bunko Rare Books – Digital Silk Road Project
Watson, Burton (1993). Records of the Grand Historian of China. Han Dynasty II. (Revised Edition). New York, Columbia University Press. 
Watters, Thomas (1904–1905). On Yuan Chwang's Travels in India. London. Royal Asiatic Society. Reprint: 1973.

External links

The International Dunhuang Project – includes tens of thousands of digitised manuscripts and paintings from Dunhuang, along with historical photographs and archival material
Dunhuang at the British Museum (accessed 30 Jan 2018)
Qianfodong at the British Museum (accessed 30 Jan 2018)
Dunhuang Collection at the National Museum of India

 
Central Asian Buddhist sites
Populated places along the Silk Road
Cities in Gansu
Oases of China
Populated places established in the 2nd century BC
County-level divisions of Gansu